Rebag is a New York-based online and brick-and-mortar retail platform, founded in 2014, for buying, trading, and selling luxury handbags, accessories, watches, fine jewelry, shoes, and select apparel.

Description

Rebag was founded, in 2014, by CEO Charles Albert Gorra and former CMO Erwan Delacroix, under the parent company Trendly Incorporated. Rebag is a digital and brick-and-mortar retail platform on which customers can buy and sell luxury designer handbags, accessories, watches, fine jewelry, shoes, and select apparel. "Rebag's inventory includes about 99 luxury brands such as Louis Vuitton, Hermès, Chanel, Prada, Cartier, Tiffany & Co., Rolex, Rick Owens, Maison Margiela, Christian Louboutin, and Gucci. There are two options in which to shop and sell, either online or in-store.

Since 2014, the company has raised approximately $52 million in venture capital led by General Catalyst, Novator, and FJ Labs.

Locations 
Headquartered in New York City, Rebag currently operates nine brick and mortar stores: four located in New York City — in Soho, Madison Avenue, Westfield World Trade Center, and the Shops at Columbus Circle; two located in the Los Angeles metro area in Beverly Hills and Westfield Santa Anita; two locations in Miami at Brickell City Centre and Dadeland Mall and one in Greenwich, Connecticut.

The first location in Soho NYC was initially intended as a pop-up but has since become a permanent flagship location. The design of the physical locations was masterminded by Red Antler.

Another small standalone store called Rebag Bar was opened in NYC to address changes in customer shopping during the pandemic. Customers can quickly sell their pre-loved luxury goods & shop for secondhand goods.

Products

CLAIR by Rebag 
An acronym for the Comprehensive Luxury Assessment Index for Resale, CLAIR is a data driven evaluation software tool developed and released by Rebag in 2019 to instantly determine the value of new and pre-owned luxury handbags. Described as the "Kelley Blue Book of Resale."

Rebag Infinity 
A program that allows customers to purchase a bag, carry it for up to six months, exchange it for store credit worth at least 70 percent of its original purchase price, and put the credit towards a new bag.

Trade
Rebag offers the Trade option, allowing customers who are looking to buy and sell to Trade their once-loved, pre-owned luxury handbags, watches, accessories fine jewelry, shoes, and select apparel for credit towards that day's purchase.

Awards
 One of Fast Company’s 10 Most Innovative Retail Companies of 2021
Glossy 2021 Award for Fashion Retailer of the Year

Nominations 
 2019 Glossy Awards - Best Breakthrough Startup, Fashion

Accolades 
 ''Instyles "Best Places to Resell Designer Handbags Online"
 Town & Country’s "10 Best Ethical and Sustainable Fashion and Accessory Brands"
 Who What Wear's "Best Resale Sites to Know"
 W Magazine'''s "The 10 Best Online Vintage Shopping Sites"Fast Companys "The 10 most innovative style companies of 2020"

References

American companies established in 2014
Retail companies established in 2014
Internet properties established in 2014
Online retailers
Online marketplaces of the United States
E-commerce